"I Wanna Know" is a song written and recorded by Japanese-American singer-songwriter Ai. It was released by Island Records and Universal Sigma on September 6, 2006. The single sold 11,074 copies in its first week and peaked at number 9 on the Oricon singles chart.

Background 
"I Wanna Know" originally was made for a TV commercial song for PepsiCo in Japan.

Track listing

CD 
 "I Wanna Know" 
 "I Wanna Know" (Remix)
 "I Wanna Know" (Instrumental)

DVD 

"I Wanna Know"
 "Making of I Wanna Know"
 "A.I. CLUB TOUR 2006 Highlights"

Charts 
"I Wanna Know" peaked at number nine on the Japan Oricon Singles chart. The song was on the charts for seven weeks.

Credits and personnel 
Credits adapted from Tidal.

 Ai Uemura – vocals, songwriting
 DJ Watari – producer, composer
 Jin – producer, composer

References

2006 singles
2006 songs
Ai (singer) songs
Island Records singles
Songs written by Ai (singer)
Universal Sigma singles